St. Bernard's-Jacques Fontaine is a town in the Canadian province of Newfoundland and Labrador. The town had a population of 433 in the Canada 2021 Census, a drop from 470 in 2011.

History
The town of St. Bernard's-Jacques Fontaine was amalgamated in 1994 from two small fishing communities.

St. Bernard's 
Incorporated as a town in 1967, the community was known as Fox Cove until 1915. The name was changed to differentiate it from two other communities with the same name. St. Bernard's appears to have been settled in the early 19th century by the Johnson, Stewart and Whelan families. These were primarily Anglican fishermen and as with many Newfoundland communities, as Roman Catholic fishermen began to settle there the populations diverged. St. Bernard's became predominantly Roman Catholic, while the nearby communities of Jacques Fontaine and Bay L'Argent became predominantly Anglican.

Jacques Fontaine 
Incorporated as a town in 1986, this small fishing community is located near the base of the Burin Peninsula on the east side of Fortune Bay approximately 3 km east of Bay L'Argent. The origin of the name is uncertain, perhaps deriving from an early French settler, although it appears on many early maps as Jack (or Jack's) Fontaine.

Earliest known mention of the location is by James Cook during his survey of Newfoundland on July 16, 1765, he recorded in his log: "At 7PM anchored with the best bower in a bight called Jack Fountain, in 10 fathoms water and moored with the small anchor and hawser. At noon weighed and came to sail."

The earliest known settler was a Reuben Buffett. Two of his children were born at Jack Fontaine according to the Grand Bank Methodist Church Records. Charlotte was born 19 December 1819 and Ambrose was born 21 Nov 1823.

The first recorded census in 1863 labels the community as Tank Fontaine with a population of 33 residents. In 1935, there were 125 residents, noting the most common family names as Johnson, Pardy, Allen, Harris and Brushett. In the early 1980s, the population of Jacques Fontaine reached 200, most people finding employment in the inshore and long liner fisheries.

Demographics 

See also
 List of cities and towns in Newfoundland and Labrador

References 
Newfoundland Vital Statistics, 1753–1893, Family History Library, 35 N. West Temple Street, Salt Lake City, UT 84150 USA, Burin, Grand Bank (Methodist), Birth 1817–1860, Vol. 108, p. 5, Record no. 16, Name: Charlotte Buffett

Towns in Newfoundland and Labrador
Fishing communities in Canada